Nombre de Dios is a city and seat of the municipality of Nombre de Dios, established as Pueblo Mágico on October 11, 2018, in the state of Durango, north-western Mexico.  As of 2015, the town of Nombre de Dios had a population of 5,302.

Nombre de Dios is the oldest town in Northern Mexico, founded by Francisco de Ibarra in November 17, 1562.

Localization 
Nombre de Dios is located at southeast of state's capital, Victoria de Durango, in coordinates 23°51' N and 104°51'' E. It limits north with municipalities of Durango and Poanas; south, El Mezquital and Súchil; east with Vicente Guerrero and Poanas and west with Durango and El Mezquital.

References

Populated places in Durango
Pueblos Mágicos
Populated places established in 1562